Alexander Siebenhaar (18 September 1927 – 22 February 2022) was a Swiss rower. He competed at the 1952 Summer Olympics in Helsinki with the men's coxed pair where they were eliminated in the round one repêchage.

References

1927 births
2022 deaths 
Swiss male rowers
Olympic rowers of Switzerland
Rowers at the 1952 Summer Olympics
European Rowing Championships medalists